
This is a timeline of Japanese history, comprising important legal, territorial and cultural changes and political events in Japan and its predecessor states. To read about the background to these events, see History of Japan.

 Centuries: 1st2nd3rd4th5th6th7th8th9th10th11th12th13th14th15th16th17th18th19th20th21st

Paleolithic

3rd century BC

1st century

2nd century

3rd century

4th century

5th century 
Very little is known about the 5th century in Japan. The period was definitely marked by volatile inter-state warfare, complex alliances, submissions and betrayals. Some of the more constant Yamato polity partners were Baekje and Gaya confederacy, while enemies included Goguryeo, Silla and various Chinese groups. All of the records of the era either did not survive or are contentious.

6th century

7th century

8th century

9th century

10th century

11th century

12th century

13th century

14th century

15th century

16th century

17th century

18th century

19th century

20th century

21st century

See also 
Cities in Japan
 Timeline of Fukuoka
 Timeline of Hiroshima
 Timeline of Kobe
 Timeline of Kyoto
 Timeline of Nagasaki
 Timeline of Nagoya
 Timeline of Osaka
 Timeline of Tokyo; and History of Tokyo, with "significant events" sections
 Timeline of Yokohama

References and notes

Further reading 
Published in the 19th century
 
 

Published in the 20th century
 
 
 

Published in the 21st century

External links 
 
 
 
 

Japanese
 
 
Years in Japan